Leptostylus plumeoventris is a species of beetle in the family Cerambycidae. It was described by Linsley in 1934.

Description

Distribution

References

Leptostylus
Beetles described in 1934
Taxa named by Earle Gorton Linsley